The Bats at the 37 military hospital are a colony of an estimated 1 million straw-coloured fruit bats living in the 37 Military Hospital area of Accra, the capital of Ghana. A local legend surrounds this group of animals, saying that a long time ago, a chief from a village in eastern Ghana Kibi was admitted to the hospital accompanied by megabats. He died but the bats never left the area and are still waiting for him to leave the hospital.

References

External links
 Bats In Accra Ghana (37 Military Hospital), Youtube, (9 Jan 2014)

Accra
Bats of Africa
Legends
Bats in popular culture
Eidolon (genus)